Kıralan can refer to:

 Kıralan, Çivril
 Kıralan, Ergani
 Kıralan, Karaisalı